Whittier Regional Vocational Technical High School, also known as “Whittier Tech” and/or “Big Whittier,” was founded in 1972. Located in the city of Haverhill, MA, United States, the school currently serves about 1400 students, with a 12:1 student-teacher ratio. It serves many surrounding cities and towns primarily in the northern section of Essex County, accepting students from Haverhill, Newburyport, Newbury, West Newbury, Rowley, Amesbury, Merrimac, Georgetown, Groveland, Ipswich and Salisbury. The school was named in honor of local resident, Quaker poet, and slavery abolitionist John Greenleaf Whittier.  Alongside this school, there is also a middle school called “J. G. Whittier Middle School” located in Haverhill also named after the poet.

Demographics

References

External links
 Whittier Homepage
 Letter from the Superintendent

Commonwealth Athletic Conference
Public high schools in Massachusetts
Schools in Essex County, Massachusetts